Krishan Kumar Sharma "Rasik" (born 14 November 1983) is a Hindi, Punjabi, English and Urdu poet and writer.

Personal life and education
Born in a Brahmin family in the town of Samana in the district of Patiala, Punjab. He received his formal schooling in a public school and then graduated with Mechanical Engineering from Giani Zail Singh College of Engineering & Technology, Bathinda. Later, he completed his post-graduation in Marketing from SCDL, Pune. He had been active in stage activities, NCC and NSS throughout school and college and has been honored with numerous awards and honors.

Career

After completing engineering he moved to Delhi to pursue his career and been deputed in Ghaziabad, Chennai and Bangalore cities. He continues his interest in writing. He writes mainly poems and stories in Hindi, Punjabi, English and Urdu.

List of works
"Ab Har Shaam Niraali Hogi" , "It's For You ! It's Only For You..." , "Prem Ka Pyala" , "Pinjre De Azad Panchi" and "In Search of You, My Dear..." are published in 2011, 2013, 2014, 2015 and 2019 respectively. His other literary collection has an English Novel for Children, Motivational & Self Improvement Book, a Punjabi Novel, a Hindi Novel and one Urdu (Bi-Lingual Urdu-Hindi) Ghazals book.

Recognition's 
"Ab Har Shaam Niraali Hogi" and "Prem Ka Pyala" have been recognized and recommended by Govt. of India, Department of Official Language for the years 2011–12; 2012–13 and 2014–15 respectively.  His literary work has been covered in various newspapers like Punjab Kesari, Dainik Jagran, Dainik Tribune, The Tribune, Aaj Samaj, Yugmarg, Dainik Bhaskar and Amar Ujala. Also a short documentary on his work was telecast on MH1 News Channel.

References

 http://rajbhasha.nic.in/pdf/books_list2014.pdf
 https://web.archive.org/web/20111005054451/http://www.indianwriters.org/addresses/State.wise.pdf
 https://archive.today/20140617035653/http://chandigarh.punjabkesari.in/chandigarhkesari/fullstory/150771480_366924
 https://web.archive.org/web/20140929031632/http://yugmarg.com/english/?page_id=594
 http://epaper.tribuneindia.com/c/2762017
 https://web.archive.org/web/20140314134526/http://epaper.jagran.com/ePaperArticle/03-mar-2014-edition-Chandigarh-page_13-52911-7236-261.html
 http://epaper.amarujala.com/svww_zoomart.php?Artname=20140228i_004121007&ileft=449&itop=1053&zoomRatio=177&AN=20140228i_004121007
 http://epaper.bhaskar.com/city-life/266/27022014/cph/2/
 http://dainiktribuneonline.com/2014/01/%E0%A4%AA%E0%A5%8D%E0%A4%B0%E0%A5%87%E0%A4%AE-%E0%A4%95%E0%A5%87-%E0%A4%A7%E0%A5%82%E0%A4%AA-%E0%A4%9B%E0%A4%BE%E0%A4%82%E0%A4%B9%E0%A5%80-%E0%A4%B0%E0%A4%82%E0%A4%97/
 https://web.archive.org/web/20140314115846/http://www.etyoungleaders.com/search.php?nameMail=krishan
 https://plus.google.com/u/0/photos?pid=5203920385582610914&oid=112437975318008003056
 Rasik, Krishan Kumar Sharma (2011). Ab har shaam niraali hogi, ARS Publishers, India. .
 https://web.archive.org/web/20130514075118/http://rajbhasha.nic.in/IIContent.aspx?t=enbooks_list
 https://web.archive.org/web/20130731171916/http://rajbhasha.nic.in/hindibooks-2012.pdf
 https://web.archive.org/web/20130731165822/http://rajbhasha.nic.in/hindibooks-2011.pdf
 https://www.amazon.in/Search-You-My-Dear/dp/8193573331/ref=pd_ybh_a_1?_encoding=UTF8&psc=1&refRID=XFB1R9CK4TWH2YBHWDYZ

1983 births
Living people
Hindi-language poets
Indian male poets
Poets from Punjab, India